In the 2000 Music City Bowl, West Virginia defeated Ole Miss 49–38. This game was also West Virginia Mountaineers football coach Don Nehlen's final game. Although West Virginia won the game, it was notable because of a second half comeback by freshman Eli Manning. Down 49–16 in the fourth quarter, Ole Miss coach David Cutcliffe inserted Manning. Ole Miss scored 22 unanswered points in the fourth quarter.
The game was played in below-freezing temperatures. The temperature at kickoff was 31 degrees, and climbed down to 27 degrees by the end of the game.

References

Music City Bowl
Music City Bowl
Ole Miss Rebels football bowl games
West Virginia Mountaineers football bowl games
December 2000 sports events in the United States
2000 in sports in Tennessee